Donald L. Hanmer (October 17, 1919  – May 24, 2003) was an American film actor. The Chicago-born actor began his career on Broadway, where he was considered once a big hit. He appeared in 90 films between 1945 until 1991.

In 1966, he played a barber on the TV Western Series Gunsmoke in “Gunfighter, RIP” (S12E6). 

He died in Monterey, California from cancer at age 83. He was first married to actress Jocelyn Brando, and, later, to Susan Tucker Huntington.

Filmography

References

External links

1919 births
2003 deaths
20th-century American male actors
Male actors from Chicago
Deaths from cancer in California